The Rehvar are a  clan found in the state of Gujarat in India.

Origin
The Rehvar Rajput are originally Parmar who came from Ujjain and settled in Chundravati. They then migrated to Tharparkar in Sindh, and then moved to Banaskantha. The Rehvar were rulers of the states of Bolundra, Mohanpur, Ranasan, Rupal, and Wadagam. The community is found mainly in Saurashtra and north Gujarat.

See also
 Jats of Gujarat

References

Jat clans